Carilephia is a genus of moths in the subfamily Arctiinae. It contains the single species Carilephia moninna, which is found on the Philippines (Luzon).

References

Natural History Museum Lepidoptera generic names catalog

Lithosiini